John the Younger or John, the Younger may refer to:

John II, Duke of Schleswig-Holstein-Sonderburg (1545–1622)
John, Hereditary Prince of Saxony (1498–1537)
John Bettes the Younger (died 1616), English portrait painter
John Bowdler the Younger (1783–1815), English essayist, poet and lawyer
John Bramston the Younger (1611–1700), English lawyer and politician who sat in the House of Commons from 1660 to 1679
John Brinsley the Younger (1600–1665), English nonconforming clergyman and ejected minister
John Calcraft (the younger) (1765–1831), English landowner and Member of Parliament
John Cleveley the Younger (1747–1786), British artist and marine painter
John Hotham, the younger (1610–1645), English Member of Parliament and military commander
John Tradescant the Younger (1608–1662), botanist and gardener
John Winthrop the Younger (1606–1676), early governor of the Connecticut Colony
John Wood, the Younger (1728–1782), English architect

See also
John Younger (disambiguation)